Livingston Creek is a stream in the Washington and Scott counties of Virginia, in the United States. It is a tributary of the North Fork Holston River.

History 
Livingston Creek was named for a family of early settlers.

See also
List of rivers of Virginia
Mendota, Virginia

References

Rivers of Scott County, Virginia
Rivers of Washington County, Virginia
Rivers of Virginia